This is the results breakdown of the local elections held in Navarre on 25 May 2003. The following tables show detailed results in the autonomous community's most populous municipalities, sorted alphabetically.

Overall

City control
The following table lists party control in the most populous municipalities, including provincial capitals (shown in bold). Gains for a party are displayed with the cell's background shaded in that party's colour.

Municipalities

Barañain
Population: 22,017

Burlada
Population: 17,647

Estella
Population: 13,150

Pamplona
Population: 189,364

Tafalla
Population: 10,646

Tudela
Population: 30,355

See also
2003 Navarrese regional election

References

Navarre
2003